Tattva : The Very Best of Kula Shaker 2007 is a best-of double album released in 2007 by the record label Music Club. It includes all the tracks from Kula Shaker's first two albums and a handful of previously released non-album tracks.  It is not an official 'best of' and the band have asked fans not to buy it.

Track listing
Disc 1
"Hey Dude" – 4:11
"Knight on the Town" – 3:25
"Temple of Everlasting Light" – 2:33
"Govinda" – 4:57
"Smart Dogs" – 3:17
"Magic Theatre" – 2:39
"Into The Deep" – 3:50
"Sleeping Jiva" – 2:02
"Tattva" – 3:47
"Grateful When You're Dead/Jerry Was There" – 5:42
"303" – 3:09
"Start All Over" – 2:36
"Hollow Man (Parts 1&2)" – 6:15
"Another Life" – 4:19
"Troubled Mind" – 3:14
"Smart Dogs (Live)" – 3:47
"Govinda (Live)" – 8:11
"Hey Dude (Live)" – 5:29

Disc 2
"Hush" – 2:59
"Great Hosannah" – 6:07
"Mystical Machine Gun" – 5:42
"SOS" – 2:55
"Radhe Radhe" – 2:49
"I'm Still Here" – 1:31
"Shower Your Love" – 3:40
"108 Battles (Of The Mind)" – 3:16
"Sound of Drums" – 4:28
"Timeworm" – 4:02
"Last Farewell" – 2:47
"Golden Avatar" – 4:30
"Namami Nanda-Nandana" – 5:10
"Stotra" – 2:25
"Hurry on Sundown (Hari Om Sundown)" – 4:42
"Guitar Man" – 3:05
"Avalonia" – 2:18
"Sound of Drums (Live)" – 4:25

Kula Shaker albums
2007 greatest hits albums